is a 1960 Japanese drama film directed by Yasuzō Masumura. It is based on the story Gisho no toki by Japanese writer Kenzaburō Ōe.

Plot
For the fourth time in a row, Hikoichi has failed to pass the exams to enter a prestigious university. He lies to his mother, a shop owner and widow who hopes for a brighter future for her son, that he passed the exams, and walks around in a student's uniform, pretending to be a freshman. When student activist leader Soratani is arrested by the police, he mistakes Hikoichi for a fellow student and orders him to bring the news of his arrest to his zengakuren comrades. Hikoichi, eager to be accepted by the activists as one of them, and trying to impress student Mutsuko, participates in a rally where many protestors are arrested. After his quick dismissal by the police, who realise that he is neither a student nor a political agitator, the activists suspect Hikoichi to be an informant.

Cast
 Ayako Wakao as Mutsuko
 Jerry Fujio as Hikoichi
 Jun Fujimaki as Yasuo Kida
 Eiji Funakoshi as Kyosuke
 Jūzō Itami as Soratani (credited Ichizo Itami)
 Kaneko Iwasaki as Kinuko
 Hideo Takamatsu as Prosecutor
 Sachiko Murase as Hikoichi's mother
 Nobuo Nakamura as Takagi

References

External links
 

1960 films
1960 drama films
Japanese drama films
Japanese black-and-white films
Films directed by Yasuzo Masumura
Films based on short fiction
1960s Japanese films
1960s Japanese-language films